The Montserrat worm snake (Antillotyphlops monastus) is a species of blind snake that is endemic to the Caribbean Lesser Antilles.

It has a trunk length up to 258 mm, with a tail up to 44 mm long.  Its dorsal surface is medium brown, with a lighter ventral surface.  It is insectivorous and fossorial.

It is found on Montserrat.

References

Antillotyphlops
Endemic fauna of Montserrat
Snakes of the Caribbean
Reptiles of Montserrat
Reptiles described in 1966